Worldista (stylized in all caps) is the 10th studio album by Japanese boy band NEWS. It was released on February 20, 2019, through Johnny's Entertainment, and is the third in the series of albums named after the initials of the band's name, following Neverland and Epcotia. It was preceded by the singles "Blue" and "Ikiro", both released in 2018, and debuted at number one on the Oricon Albums Chart, selling over 108,000 copies in its first week. The band toured Japan in support of the album in 2019.

Background
The album's central concept is that of a virtual world called "Worldista" that the four members are transported to, where people can interact with others from all around the world using the Internet.

Release
The album was released in two versions; the regular edition, which features four bonus tracks in the form of a solo song from each member, and a limited edition including a DVD with a 20-minute behind-the-scenes on the making of the album.

Promotion
In addition to the two singles "Blue" and "Ikiro", the song "Spirit" was previously used as the theme song for Nippon Television's coverage of the 2018 FIFA Club World Cup, held in the United Arab Emirates.

Track listing

Charts

Weekly charts

Year-end charts

See also
 List of Oricon number-one albums of 2019

References

2019 albums
Japanese-language albums
News (band) albums